Old Broadway Synagogue is an Orthodox Jewish synagogue in the Manhattanville neighborhood of Manhattan in New York City incorporated in 1911 under the name Chevra Talmud Torah Anshei Marovi, by an immigrant named Morris Schiff. Schiff was a Polish immigrant who lived in the Harlem area, an area with a high Jewish population at the time. The building is listed individually on the National Register of Historic Places.

Description
The Synagogue is located at 15 Old Broadway (a rare vestige of the Bloomingdale Road in Manhattan). The Old Broadway Synagogue is a "vernacular" style synagogue  built in 1923 by the architectural firm of Meisner & Uffner.  The congregation formed from the mostly Ashkenazic Jewish population of Russian and Polish immigrants to New York during the 1880s who had made their way up to Central Harlem, then migrated to blocks west. The members initially met in storefronts and purportedly in the back room of a bar until the congregation purchased a house on Old Broadway. This structure was torn down shortly thereafter to make way for the synagogue. The congregation had an active Talmud Torah (Hebrew school) probably from its founding until the 1960s or 1970s. Among its early rabbis were the author Simon Glazer and Shepard Brodie.

The Synagogue is perhaps best known for its late rabbi, Jacob Kret, a former rosh yeshiva (head of a rabbinic academy) in Bialystok and later Ostrow Mazowiecka, Poland.  After the division of Poland between Germany and USSR, Rabbi Kret was arrested by the Soviet authorities while attempting to bring his students to relative safety in Lithuania. He was then deported to a Soviet labor camp, and was later released. After the war, Rabbi Kret headed a yeshiva that was in or associated with the Displaced Persons camp in Zeilsheim, a section of Frankfurt. By the time Rabbi Kret became the spiritual leader of the Old Broadway Synagogue in 1950, many of the founding families had moved away. Rabbi Kret recruited Holocaust survivors who were moving to New York at that time to settle in the vicinity of the synagogue. These survivors, many of whom came from Polish Hasidic backgrounds, helped fill the synagogue in the 1950s and 1960s. By the time most of these had moved away, in the 1970s and 1980s, Rabbi Kret had become a mashgiach (kosher food supervisor) in the nearby Barnard College dining hall as well as a Talmud tutor at the Jewish Theological Seminary of America students. As such Rabbi Kret had a deep influence on many Columbia University, Barnard College and Jewish Theological Seminary students until he retired from the Synagogue in November 1997. He died in February 2007.

Today
Since 2000, the Synagogue has attracted young people who live in Harlem and Washington Heights, as well as from Morningside Heights and the Upper West Side. The Synagogue offers a weekly class on Pirkei Avot (Ethics of the Fathers), a section of the Talmud containing ethical maxims. 

Dr. Paul Radensky, Museum Educator for Jewish Schools for the Museum of Jewish Heritage - A Living Memorial to the Holocaust, is the  president of the congregation. The synagogue also has a "Shabbaton" once a month where they bring in a guest scholar, whether that be a speaker or a Rabbi to come and speak, in addition to having meals for Friday night, Sabbath day, and Sabbath afternoon.

References

External links
 
 Member blog
 Blog of the synagogue president

Properties of religious function on the National Register of Historic Places in Manhattan
Synagogues completed in 1923
Jewish organizations established in 1911
Polish-Jewish culture in New York City
Russian-Jewish culture in New York City
Synagogues in Manhattan
Orthodox synagogues in New York City
Gothic Revival architecture in New York City
Ukrainian-Jewish culture in New York City
Harlem
Synagogues on the National Register of Historic Places in New York City